Sai River, formerly known as the River of Lawa, is a river that forms the natural border between Thailand and Myanmar at Tachileik and Mae Sai Districts. Mae Sai town, where the bridge crossing the international border is located, is named after this river. It is a tributary of the Ruak River, itself a tributary of the Mekong.

Course
The river has its sources in the Daen Lao Range, in Shan State, Myanmar. Then it flows southeastwards, bending eastwards at the feet of the northern end of the Doi Nang Non ridge before flowing through the Tachileik/Mae Sai urban area, where there is a sign marking the northernmost point of Thailand just east of the border-crossing bridge —at the meeting point of Thailand Route 1 and National Highway 4 (Burma)— over the river.

References

Myanmar–Thailand border
Rivers of Myanmar
Rivers of Thailand
International rivers of Asia